Arthur Lawson (1908–1970) was a British art director. He had a long association with film directors Michael Powell and Emeric Pressburger, beginning in 1943 when he was floor manager on The Life and Death of Colonel Blimp. Three years later, when Powell and Pressburger, also known as The Archers, made A Matter of Life and Death, Lawson had graduated to assistant art director. He worked with Alfred Junge on the sets for Black Narcissus in 1947, and earned an Oscar for the set designs on The Red Shoes in 1948. Lawson's association with Powell continued right through to Peeping Tom (1960). He received a BAFTA nomination for The Bedford Incident in 1965.

Listing of films:

1942       The Foreman Went to France

1943       The Life and Death of Colonel Blimp

1944       This Happy Breed

1944       The Way Ahead

1945       They Knew Mr. Knight

1946       A Matter of Life and Death

1947       Black Narcissus

1948       The Red Shoes

1950       Gone to Earth

1950       The Elusive Pimpernel

1951       The Tales of Hoffmann

1952       Folly to Be Wise

1952       The Story of Robin Hood and His Merry Men

1953       Twice upon a Time

1953       Front Page Story

1954       The Constant Husband

1955       Oh... Rosalinda!!

1955       Richard III

1956       The Battle of the River Plate

1956       Sea Wife

1956       The High Terrace

1957       Hour of Decision

1957       Seven Thunders

1958       Harry Black

1959       The Devils  Desciple

1960       Sink the Bismarck

1960       Cleopatra

1960       Peeping Tom

1961       The Valiant

1962       The Very Edge

1962       Vengeance

1962       H.M.S. Defiant

1963       The Leather Boys

1963       Hornblower

1965       The Bedford Incident

1965       Called in to assist in Those Magnificent Men in Their Flying Machines

1966.        The Blue Max....Travelling mat expertise

1966       Binddle (One of Them Days)

1967       The Double Man

1968       The Lost Continent

1968       Midas Run

References

External links

British art directors
1908 births
1970 deaths
Best Art Direction Academy Award winners
Place of birth missing